The 2000 Brickyard 400, the 7th running of the event, was a NASCAR Winston Cup Series race held on August 5, 2000 at Indianapolis Motor Speedway in Speedway, Indiana. Contested over 160 laps on the 2.5 mile (4.023 km) speedway, it was the twentieth race of the 2000 NASCAR Winston Cup Series season. Bobby Labonte of Joe Gibbs Racing won the race.

Background 

The Indianapolis Motor Speedway, located in Speedway, Indiana, (an enclave suburb of Indianapolis) in the United States, is the home of the Indianapolis 500 and the Brickyard 400. The track's turns are banked at 9 degrees, while the front stretch, the location of the finish line, has no banking. The back stretch, opposite of the front, also has a zero degree banking. The racetrack has seats for more than 250,000 spectators.

Prior to the race, Kyle Petty replaced Jeremy Mayfield in the latter's No. 12 Mobil 1 Ford Taurus after NASCAR officials did not clear Mayfield for competition after he suffered a concussion during practice. Petty had failed to qualify his No. 44 Hot Wheels Pontiac Grand Prix for the race.

Top 10 results

Race statistics 
 Time of race: 2:33:56
 Average Speed: 
 Pole Speed: 181.068
 Cautions: 2 for 7 laps
 Margin of Victory: 4.229
 Lead changes: 9
 Percent of race run under caution: 4.4%
 Average green flag run: 51 laps

Broadcast 
The race was aired live on ABC in which was the latter's last broadcast of the NASCAR Winston Cup Series until 2007 (in which the series was renamed to the NASCAR Nextel Cup Series) as part of ESPN group of networks.

References 

Brickyard 400
Brickyard 400
NASCAR races at Indianapolis Motor Speedway